The Australian Rugby Championship, often abbreviated to the ARC and also known as the Mazda Australian Rugby Championship for sponsorship purposes, is a now-defunct domestic professional men's rugby union football competition in Australia, which ran for only one season in 2007. It was the predecessor to the current National Rugby Championship. The competition, similar to New Zealand's ITM Cup and South Africa's Currie Cup, aimed to bridge the gap between existing club rugby and the international Super Rugby competition then known as Super 14. The ARC involved eight teams: three from New South Wales, two from Queensland, and one each from the Australian Capital Territory, Victoria and Western Australia.

From its inception the ARC divided many in Australian rugby, with arguments over the structure and format of the competition, and concerns that the creation of arbitrary state-based teams would undermine the strong club competitions in Sydney and Brisbane. On 18 December 2007, the Australian Rugby Union (ARU) announced that the ARC would be shut down due to heavy financial losses: the ARC lost A$4.7 million during the 2007 season, with projected losses of $3.3 million for 2008.

On 10 December 2013, Bill Pulver, the CEO of the Australian Rugby Union, announced a new competition along similar lines, the National Rugby Championship, to include 8 to 10 teams in "major population centres".

History 
The official announcement on the agreement to create a national rugby competition in Australia was made in mid-2006, following a 70-person three-day summit in Sydney that agreed to an eight team competition. However, the competition was not without its share of controversy, with some of the strong state-level clubs being against the formation of a new level of competition, claiming it could harm club and grassroots rugby. In September, an ARU board meeting, after hearing these concerns, officially approved the new competition.

A month later, the competition kicked off, however the Queensland teams performed poorly as the East Coast Aces and Ballymore Tornadoes finished last and second last respectively. 

The Perth Spirit performed the best out of the regular rounds winning six out of eight games, but due to bonus points finished third on the ladder behind the Central Coast Rays and minor premiers the Western Sydney Rams.

After the top four teams took part in the semi-finals, the Melbourne Rebels and Central Coast Rays would compete in the first and last ARC Grand Final: the Rays defeated the Rebels 20–12 to win the premiership.

After a review of the ARC was undertaken following the 2007 season, it was found that it had run $1.3 million over budget and had lost $4.7 million for the 2007 season, with forecast losses for a 2008 season coming to a further $3.3 million. The ARU, concluding that a cumulative loss of $8 million over two years would be fiscal irresponsiblity and that it was likely there would be further heavy future losses beyond 2008, immediately decided to shut down the competition.

Format

Competition 
The competition ran for eight weeks, with finals being competed over an additional two weeks - each side played eight games, with the top four teams qualifying for the semi-finals where the winners move into the final. The competition kicked off in August, after the Super 14 and the March to July club competitions finished, and avoiding a clash with Australian under-19 and under-21 duties and the Pacific Nations Cup (in which Australia A played). In total, 35 matches were played in the ARC over 10 weeks from 11 August and 14 October, with games played on Fridays and Sundays. It was originally planned that games would not be played at 'traditional' times for rugby matches, but this decision was changed when the ABC insisted that its televised games be played on Saturday and Sunday afternoons. The inaugural final was played between the Central Coast Rays and the Melbourne Rebels in Gosford.

Players 
The timeframe of the season ensured the availability of Super 14 players (excluding Wallabies). There was no draft, and players were free to choose their team, although there was a salary cap in place. Players came from local competitions (which includes Super 14 players). Each Super 14 franchise was aligned with the respective teams, except for Melbourne, as Victoria had no Super rugby team at the time.

It was planned that although 35 footballers will be on international duty for the Wallabies, over 90 Super 14 players would go into the ARC, leaving the way for over 120 footballers to step up from first grade club competitions.

It was also planned that each team would have one "marquee" footballer not be subject to financial restrictions of the player contracting protocol. The player could be either foreign or a non-contracted domestic footballer, and if a team signed an Australian as their marquee footballer, they would still be able to sign up a foreign footballer, though they would have to fit within the contract restrictions.

Rules 
The ARU announced in June 2007 that the inaugural championship would adopt the Experimental Law Variations (ELVs), which were initially trialled at South Africa's Stellenbosch University and which aim to bring more free-flowing play into the game. The laws were implemented in both the Sydney and Brisbane club competitions and were well received.

Referees 
The referees supplied for the tournament predominantly come from the Australian Rugby Union Panels.

Referees for the tournament included: Matt Goddard, James Leckie, James Scholtens, George Ayoub, Daniel Cheever, Brett Bowden, Andrew Lindsay and Geoff Acton.

Stuart Dickinson and Paul Marks did not referee in the tournament, as they refereed at the 2007 Rugby World Cup in France.

Media coverage 
The Championship was broadcast on free-to-air television during its only season. The Australian Broadcasting Corporation (ABC) secured the rights to exclusively televise the competition from 2007 through to 2009 by agreeing to accept a substantial fee from the ARU in order to cover the matches. 

The fact that the sport's governing organisation had to pay a television station to broadcast the Championship arguably left worrying implications for a code that was struggling to attract mainstream interest in Australia. The ABC committed to broadcast 19 matches during the season on ABC1 and ABC2: two matches from each round, the semi-finals and the final. 

The previous time the ABC had covered elite-level rugby was for the 1991 Rugby World Cup (which Australia won).

Regular season 2007 
The eight teams played four home games and four away games each during the preliminary competition rounds, consisting of a single round-robin with each team playing each other once plus an additional return match for the "derby" fixture played in the first round (these fixtures were matches between the closest neighbouring teams in most cases). The top four teams at the end of the preliminary competition rounds qualified for the title play-offs with semi-finals and finals.

Standings

Competition rounds

Round 1

Round 2

Round 3

Round 4

Round 5

Round 6

Round 7

Round 8

Title play-offs 2007
The top four sides in the regular season advanced to the knock-out stage of semi-finals and final to decide the Australian Rugby Championship title.

Semi-finals

Grand Final

Players 2007

Leading try scorers 

Source: rugby.com.au

Leading point scorers

Source: rugby.com.au

Squad lists
Team squad lists for the 2007 ARC:

{| class="collapsible collapsed" style=" width: 100%; margin: 0px; border: 1px solid darkgray; border-spacing: 3px;"
|-
! colspan="10" style="background-color:#f2f2f2; cell-border:2px solid black; padding-left: 1em; padding-right: 1em; text-align: center;" |2007 Ballymore Tornadoes squad – ARC
|-
| width="3%"| 
| width="30%" style="font-size: 95%;" valign="top"|

Props
Ben Coutts THP (Souths)*
Greg Holmes LHP (Sunnybank)*
Peter Loane THP (Norths)
Brett Naylor THP (GPS)
Shon Siemonek LHP (Sunshine Coast)
Ernest Skelton LHP (Wests)*

Hookers
Geoff Abram HK (Wests)*
Sean Hardman HK (Brothers)
Joshua Mann-Rea HK (Easts)

Locks
Jared Hanna LK (Wests)
James Horwill LK (University)*
Tristan Hill LK (Norths)
Daniel Linde LK (University)**
Ed O'Donoghue LK (Wests)*

| width="3%"| 
| width="30%" style="font-size: 95%;" valign="top"|

Loose Forwards
Leroy Houston BR (Sydney)*
Steve Miller BR (GPS)
Tom McVerry BR (GPS) Captain*
Ray Stowers BR (Norths)
Scott Higginbotham N8 (Wests)**
Charles Wyllie N8 (Sunshine Coast)

Scrum-halves
Sam Cordingley SH (Brothers)*
Will Genia SH (GPS)*
Brendan McKibbin SH (Brothers)**

Fly-halves
David Collis FH (Sydney)
Berrick Barnes FH (Wests)*
Peter Hynes FH WG (University)*

| width="3%"| 
| width="30%" style="font-size: 95%;" valign="top"|

Centres
Blair Connor CE WG (Norths)**
Brett Gillespie CE (University)**
Byron Roberts OB (GPS)
Tim Sampson CE (Sunnybank)
Donovan Slade CE (GPS)

Wings
Paul Doneley OB (Brothers)
Elia Tuqiri WG FH (GPS)
Anthony Sauer OB (Brothers)

Fullbacks
Clinton Schifcofske FB (Wests)*

* Contracted Queensland Reds player
** Reds Academy player
|}

{| class="collapsible collapsed" style=" width: 100%; margin: 0px; border: 1px solid darkgray; border-spacing: 3px;"
|-
! colspan="10" style="background-color:#f2f2f2; cell-border:2px solid black; padding-left: 1em; padding-right: 1em; text-align: center;" |2007 Canberra Vikings – ARC
|-
| width="3%"| 
| width="30%" style="font-size: 95%;" valign="top"|

Props
Nic Henderson
Jack Kennedy
Pauliasi Tomoepeau
John Ulugia

Hookers
Saia Faingaa
Anthony Hegarty
Dan Raymond

Locks
Alister Campbell
Peter Kimlin
Leon Power
Adam Wallace-Harrison

| width="3%"| 
| width="30%" style="font-size: 95%;" valign="top"|

Back row
Jarred Barry
Mark Chisholm
Dan Guinness
Julian Salvi
Jone Tawake
Henry Vanderglas

Halfbacks
Beau Mokotupu
Nick Haydon
Patrick Phibbs

Flyhalves
Christian Lealiifano

| width="3%"| 
| width="30%" style="font-size: 95%;" valign="top"|

Centres
Tim Cornforth
Matthew Carraro
Anthony Faingaa
Gene Fairbanks
Rowan Kellam

Wings
Francis Fainifo
Solomona Fainifo
Eddie Mclaughlin

Fullbacks
Tim Wright
|}

{| class="collapsible collapsed" style=" width: 100%; margin: 0px; border: 1px solid darkgray; border-spacing: 3px;"
|-
! colspan="10" style="background-color:#f2f2f2; cell-border:2px solid black; padding-left: 1em; padding-right: 1em; text-align: center;" |2007 Central Coast Rays squad – ARC
|-
| width="3%"| 
| width="30%" style="font-size: 95%;" valign="top"|

Props
Al Baxter†
Ofa Fainga’anuku
Nick Lah
Rod Moore‡
Aaron Tawera

Hookers
Alex Gluth
Al Manning 
Dustin McGregor

Locks
John Adams
Nifo Nifo
Chris Thompson
Cameron Treloar

| width="3%"| 
| width="30%" style="font-size: 95%;" valign="top"|

Loose Forwards
Ross Duncan
Steve Evans
Jared Waerea-Hargreaves
Jason Peseta
Wycliff Palu†
Vili Ratu
Beau Robinson
Dylan Sigg

Scrum-halves
Brett Sheehan

Fly-halves
Clint Eadie
David Harvey 
Sam Norton-Knight

| width="3%"| 
| width="30%" style="font-size: 95%;" valign="top"|

Centres
Sam Harris
Ben Jacobs

Wings
Jordan Macey
Pat McCabe
Jye Mullane
Andrew Smith

Fullbacks
Peter Hewat

† Player not in initial squad
‡ Did not play
|}

{| class="collapsible collapsed" style=" width: 100%; margin: 0px; border: 1px solid darkgray; border-spacing: 3px;"
|-
! colspan="10" style="background-color:#f2f2f2; cell-border:2px solid black; padding-left: 1em; padding-right: 1em; text-align: center;" |2007 East Coast Aces squad – ARC
|-
| width="3%"| 
| width="30%" style="font-size: 95%;" valign="top"|

Props
 
 Tama Tuirirangi (Gold Coast)
 Ben Coutts (Souths)
 Joe Tufuga (Sunnybank)

Hookers
 Jade Ingham (Easts)
 Ole Avei (Sunnybank)

Locks
 Will Munsie (Gold Coast)
 Luke Caughley (Gold Coast)
 Rob Simmons (Sunnybank)

| width="3%"| 
| width="30%" style="font-size: 95%;" valign="top"|

Back row
 Ben Mowen (Easts)
 
 A.J. Gilbert (Souths)
 Josh Afu (Sunnybank)

Halfbacks
 Nic Berry (Sunnybank)
 Sam Batty (Gold Coast)

Flyhalves
 Ben Lucas (Sunnybank)
 

| width="3%"| 
| width="30%" style="font-size: 95%;" valign="top"|

Centres
 
 Waitai Walker (Sunnybank)
 Charlie Fetoai (Souths)
 Henari Veratau (Sunnybank)

Wings
 Caleb Brown (Gold Coast)
 Brett Stapleton (Gold Coast)

Fullbacks
 Chris Latham (Gold Coast)
 Andrew Walker (Easts)
 Marshall Milroy (Gold Coast)
 John Dart (Sunnybank)

|}

{| class="collapsible collapsed" style=" width: 100%; margin: 0px; border: 1px solid darkgray; border-spacing: 3px;"
|-
! colspan="10" style="background:#f2f2f2; cell-border:2px solid black; padding-left:1em; padding-right:1em; text-align:center;"|2007 Melbourne Rebels squad – ARC
|-
| width="3%"| 
| width="30%" style="font-size: 95%;" valign="top"|

Props
Scott Cameron PR (Sydney Uni)
Heamani Lavaka PR (Easts, Sydney)
Dan Palmer THP (Southern Districts)
Mike Ross PR (Easts, Sydney)

Hookers
Nick Churven HK (GPS)
James Hanson HK (UQ)
Nick Hensley HK (Sydney Uni)

Locks
Matt Cockbain FL, LK (GPS)
Liam Shaw LK (Brothers)
Richard Stanford LK (Brumbies)

| width="3%"| 
| width="30%" style="font-size: 95%;" valign="top"|

Loose Forwards
David Croft FL (Reds, Brothers) Captain
David Dennis FL (Waratahs)
Dave Haigh FL (Sydney Uni)
David Haydon FL (Sydney Uni)
Matt Hodgson FL (Force 	)
Shawn Mackay FL (Randwick)
Filipe Manu N8 (Souths, Brisbane)

Scrum-halves
Luke Burgess SH (Waratahs)
Jon McGrath SH (Force 	)

Fly-halves
Michael Hobbs FH (UQ)
Dan Kelly FH (Sydney Uni)

| width="3%"| 
| width="30%" style="font-size: 95%;" valign="top"|

Centres 
Luke Cross CE (GPS)
Jack Farrer CE (Sydney Uni)
James Lew CE (Norths, Sydney)

Wings
Digby Ioane WG, CE (Reds)
Peter Playford WG, CE (Brumbies)
Peter Owens WG (Sydney Uni)
Nathan Trist WG (Sydney Uni)

Fullbacks
Damon Murphy WG, FB (Brothers)
|}

{| class="collapsible collapsed" style=" width: 100%; margin: 0px; border: 1px solid darkgray; border-spacing: 3px;"
|-
! colspan="10" style="background-color:#f2f2f2; cell-border:2px solid black; padding-left: 1em; padding-right: 1em; text-align: center;" |2007 Perth Spirit squad – ARC
|-
| width="3%"| 
| width="30%" style="font-size: 95%;" valign="top"|

Props
Pekahou Cowan PR
Gareth Hardy PR

Troy Takiari PR
AJ Whalley PR

Hookers
Luke Holmes HK
Tai McIsaac HK
Ryan Tyrell HK

Locks
Tom Hockings LK
Sitaleki Timani LK
Rudi Vedelago LK 
Luke Doherty LK BR
Scott Fardy LK BR

| width="3%"| 
| width="30%" style="font-size: 95%;" valign="top"|

Back row
Scott Fava BR
Will Bloem FL
Richard Brown N8
David Pocock OF

Halfbacks
Matt Henjak SH Captain
James Stannard SH

Flyhalves
Scott Daruda FH 
Todd Feather FH
Jimmy Hilgendorf FH 

| width="3%"| 
| width="30%" style="font-size: 95%;" valign="top"|

Centres
Ryan Cross CE
Junior Pelesasa CE
Kane Allen OB

Wings
Ed Jenkins WG
Jackson Mullane WG
Dan Bailey OB
Nick Cummins OB
Haig Sare OB
Ratu Siganiyavi WG

Fullbacks

Luke McLean FB
|}

{| class="collapsible collapsed" style=" width: 100%; margin: 0px; border: 1px solid darkgray; border-spacing: 3px;"
|-
! colspan="10" style="background-color:#f2f2f2; cell-border:2px solid black; padding-left: 0.25em; padding-right: 1em; text-align: center;" |2007 Sydney Fleet squad – ARC
|-
| width="3%"| 
| width="30%" style="font-size: 95%;" valign="top"|

Props
Sean Baker (Randwick)
Dayna Edwards (Randwick) 
Jeremy Tilse (Sydney Uni)
Laurie Weeks (Sydney Uni)

Hookers
Atonio Halangahu (Randwick)
Daniel Lewinski (Sydney Uni)
Todd Pearce (Eastwood)
Sam Zlatevski (Easts)

Locks
Adam Byrnes (Easts)
Ed Brenac (Easts)
Will Caldwell (Sydney Uni)

Matthew Whittleston (Randwick)

| width="3%"| 
| width="30%" style="font-size: 95%;" valign="top"|

Back row
Tim Davidson (Sydney Uni)
Chris Houston (Randwick)
Pat McCutcheon (Sydney Uni)
Dean Mumm (Sydney Uni)

Halfbacks
James Price (Randwick)
Nathan Sievert (Sydney Uni)
Josh Valentine (Manly)

Flyhalves

Danny Kroll (Randwick)

| width="3%"| 
| width="30%" style="font-size: 95%;" valign="top"|

Centres
Morgan Turinui (Randwick)
Tom Azar (Easts)
Tom Carter (Sydney Uni)

Wings

Andrew Barrett (Souths)
Anton La Vin (Easts)
Junior Puroku (Easts)
Filipo Toala (Eastwood)

Fullbacks
Gavin Debartolo (Easts)
Arthur Little (Randwick)
|}

{| class="collapsible collapsed" style=" width: 100%; margin: 0px; border: 1px solid darkgray; border-spacing: 3px;"
|-
! colspan="10" style="background-color:#f2f2f2; cell-border:2px solid black; padding-left: 1em; padding-right: 1em; text-align: center;" |2007 Western Sydney Rams squad – ARC
|-
| width="3%"| 
| width="30%" style="font-size: 95%;" valign="top"|

Props
 Ben Alexander LHP (Eastwood)
 
 James Lakepa PR (Manly)
 Peter Niumata PR (Penrith)
 Benn Robinson LHP (Eastwood)

Hookers
 Josh Mann-Rea HK (Manly)
 
 Ben Roberts HK (West Harbour)

Locks
 Ben Hand (c) LK (Eastwood)
 Van Humphries LK (No Club)
 Marty Wilson LK (Eastwood)
 Sam Wykes LK (Parramatta)

| width="3%"| 
| width="30%" style="font-size: 95%;" valign="top"|

Loose Forwards
 Wil Brame FL (Manly)
 Ben Coridas FL (Eastwood)
 Mark Howell FL (West Harbour)
 Gareth Palamo FL Eastwood)
 Hugh Perrett FL (Eastwood)
 Tom Egan N8 FL (Easts)

Scrum-halves
 Josh Holmes SH (Eastwood)
 

Fly-halves
 Kurtley Beale FH (Norths)
 
 Fa'atonu Fili FH FB (No Club)

| width="3%"| 
| width="30%" style="font-size: 95%;" valign="top"|

Centres
 Rory Sidey CE (West Harbour)
 Luke Johnson CE WG (Manly)
 Chris Siale CE WG (Manly)

Wings
 Filipo Toala WG (Eastwood)
 Lachlan Mitchell WG CE (Sydney Uni)

Fullbacks
 Ben Martin UB (Eastwood)
 

|}

See also 

 National Rugby Championship
 Australian Provincial Championship (defunct)
 Australian Rugby Shield (defunct)

References

External links 
 
 
 
 

 
2006 establishments in Australia
Defunct professional sports leagues in Australia
Defunct rugby union leagues in Australia
Sports leagues established in 2006